Gebelein may refer to:
 Gebelein, town in Egypt

People 
 George Christian Gebelein (1878–1945), American silversmith
 Richard S. Gebelein (1946–2021), American politician and judge